Asadabad-e Bala may refer to:
 Asadabad-e Bala, Isfahan
 Asadabad-e Bala, Yazd